The Bavarian Zugspitze Railway is one of four rack railways still working in Germany, along with the Wendelstein Railway, the Drachenfels Railway and the Stuttgart Rack Railway. The metre gauge line runs from Garmisch in the centre of Garmisch-Partenkirchen to the Zugspitzplatt, approximately 300 metres below Zugspitze, the highest mountain in Germany. The line culminates at 2,650 metres above sea level, which makes it the highest railway in Germany and the third highest in Europe. It is also the railway in Europe with the biggest height difference: 1,945 metres, the lower half being open-air and the upper half being underground.

The line is operated by the Bayerischen Zugspitzbahn Bergbahn AG (BZB), whose majority owner is the Garmisch-Partenkirchen Municipal Works. In 2007 the Zugspitze Railway was nominated for a Historic landmarks of civil engineering in Germany award.

The Zugspitze is accessible via the Seilbahn Zugspitze from Eibsee Lake or Tyrolean Zugspitze Cable Car.

History

Opening of the line 
The railway was built between 1928 and 1930 and opened in three stages.

New summit section since 1987 
The tunnel was named after the skier, Rosi Mittermaier, who was the tunnel patroness (Tunnelpatin) at the time. Here, below the Sonn-Alpin Restaurant is the new Glacier Station (Gletscher-Bahnhof) in the middle of the ski area.

For five years, both termini were worked in parallel, but since November 1992 the old route to the Schneefernerhausis is no longer routinely worked.

Route 
Here the BZB runs its own terminal station which is operationally entirely separate from the adjacent standard gauge station of the Deutsche Bahn AG. Moreover, it is still just called Garmisch, whereas the DB station bears the double-barrelled name of Garmisch-Partenkirchen, reflecting the contentious merger, formally in 1935, of the two municipalities.

For the first , as far as Grainau, the Zugspitze Railway runs as an adhesion line. Of this section, the first  run parallel to the Ausserfern Railway, built in 1913.

The railway climbs steeply uphill from Grainau, passes Eibsee station and finally arrives at the halt of Riffelriss. Immediately after the halt is the entrance to the Zugspitze Tunnel, which together with the Rosi Tunnel takes trains to the current terminus at Zugspitzplatt. About a kilometre before it reaches the terminus, the underground section of the line passes almost exactly below the summit of the Zugspitze, and a few metres away from the border with the Austrian state of Tyrol.

Technical
The Zugspitzbahn runs from Garmisch-Partenkirchen to Zugspitzplatt, a distance of 19.0 km. The track gauge is 1,000 mm and the electrification system is 1,500 V D.C. overhead line. The lower section from Garmisch to Eibsee is operated as an adhesion railway with rack assistance (i.e. using a cog-wheel system) from Grainau to Eibsee. The section above Eibsee is operated as rack only using the Riggenbach system. Passengers travelling the whole line from Garmisch to Zugspitzplatt stay on the same train.

Gallery

References

Bibliography 
Paul Schultze-Naumburg: Zugspitzbahn. in Zs. Deutsche Rundschau, November 1926
Die Bayerische Zugspitzbahn. AEG-Mitteilungen, Heft 4, April 1931
Erich Preuß: Die Bayerische Zugspitzbahn und ihre Seilbahnen, Transpress, Stuttgart 1997, 
Gerd Wolff: Deutsche Klein- und Privatbahnen. H. 7: Bayern. Eisenbahn Kurier, Freiburg,

External links 

 
Photos of the tunnel portals on the Bavarian Zugspitze Railway
Photos of the Zugspitze Railway
 

Zugspitze Railway
Metre gauge railways in Germany
Rack railways in Germany
Garmisch-Partenkirchen
Tourist attractions in Bavaria
Transport in Bavaria
Railway lines opened in 1929